The Women's Circus, a feminist not for profit organisation, provides circus performance training and social arts projects for women, trans and non binary people in the western region of Melbourne, Victoria, Australia. Training programs focus on the physical and imaginative potential of the human body, self-awareness and self-esteem. It has a history of original productions with social, educational and health themes related to women's lives.

History 
The circus began in 1991, as an initiative of the Footscray Community Arts Centre, offering training and performance projects. Women recognised as founders include Donna Jackson, director; Sally Forth, trainer and Elizabeth Walsh, director of the Footscray Community Arts Centre. The inspiration was built on the work of an earlier Wimmin's Circus, Australia's first women's circus established in Melbourne which ran from 1978-1981. The Wimmin's Circus was supported in its early days by access to the facilities and expertise of CircusOz.  Feminist Jean Taylor who joined the Women's Circus in 1991, went on to establish the Performing Older Women's Circus in 1995.

The Women's Circus toured Beijing in 1995 as part of the United Nation's Conference on Women, and performed and ran workshops in regional France in 2012. It has won several awards from Arts Victoria and the Melbourne Fringe Festival.

In 2006, the organisation moved to the Drill Hall, Footscray, and receives support by the Maribyrnong City Council.

Training 
In addition to intermediate and advanced training programs, the circus also offers a program for people who have no experience in circus training. Participants learn a range of skills including hula-hooping, juggling, trapeze, swings, acro-balance (making pyramids), climbing and tumbling.

Publications 
 Newsletter (Women's Circus (Footscray Community Arts Centre)

Productions 
 The Drill | Director: Penelope Bartlau, 2019
 Night Circus | Director: Penelope Bartlau, 2017
 Fluidity | Director: Penelope Bartlau, 2017
 The Penelopiad | Director: Steph Kehoe, 2016
 Soar | Director: Steph Kehoe, 2013
 What Do I Want? | Director: Spenser Inwood, 2013
 Red Hot Flush | Director: Deb Batton, 2012
 Leggings are Not Pants | Director: Sarah Pheasant, 2012
 Out of the Box | Director: Franca Stadler, 2012
 Snakes and Ladders | Director: Deb Batton, 2011
 Ladies Prefer Brunettes | Director: Sarah Pheasant, 2011
 Quite Contrary | Director: Deb Batton, 2010
 Melbourne City Baths Show | Directors: Sarah Pheasant & Franca Stadler, 2010
 Betty | Director: Felicia O’Brien, 2010
 Herstory | Director: Felicia O’Brien, 2009
 Here, Where We’ve Always Been | Director: Nadia Kotisch, 2008
 Antechamber | Director: Annie Davey, 2007
 A Plane Without Wings is a Rocket | Director: Annie Davey, 2006
 Daddy | Director: Donna Jackson, 2005
 Maribyrnong Pool Opening Show | Director: Donna Jackson, 2005
 Sacred | Director: Kate Sulan, 2004
 Odditorium | Director: Andrea Lemon, 2003
 Ghosts | Director: Andrea Lemon, 2003
 Secrets | Director: Sarah Cathcart, 2001
 The Island | Director: Sarah Cathcart, 2000
 Lilith | Director: Sarah Cathcart, 1999
 Night Flying | Director: Sarah Cathcart 1999
 Soles of Our Feet | Director: Sarah Cathcart 1998
 Swimming with Sharks | Director: Sarah Cathcart 1998
 Pope Joan | Director: Sarah Cathcart, 1997
 Leaping the Wire | Director: Donna Jackson, 1995
 Death, The Musical | Director: Donna Jackson, 1994
 Women and Sport | Director: Donna Jackson, 1993
 Women and Work | Director: Donna Jackson, 1992
 Women and Institutions | Director: Donna Jackson, 1991

See also
List of circuses and circus owners

References

Australian circuses
Circus schools
Women's organisations based in Australia
Women in Melbourne